The Hydra-Matic 6T40 and similar 6T45, 6T50 and 6T30 are transversely-mounted six speed automatic transmissions produced by General Motors. The 6T40, referred to in GM inner circles as the GF6, made its debut in the 2008 Chevrolet Malibu, available with the 2.4 L LE5 Ecotec engine making , and has since also been made available on the Chevrolet Cruze, Daewoo Tosca and Buick LaCrosse. It features clutch-to-clutch shifting, eliminating the bands used on older transmission designs. GM chose an "on-axis" design as opposed to folding the gearset behind the engine and transferring power through the use of a chain, as is used in most other GM front wheel drive transaxles. Ford Motor Company also produces their own variant, called the 6F35. The Buick Encore uses the 6F35 mated to the 1.4 turbo.

The 6T45 differs from the 6T40 in its use of heavier-duty components, allowing it to handle engines with greater torque. The 6T40 and 6T50 are available in front-wheel drive configuration only (MH8 and MUK), with the 6T40 also being paired with eAssist (MHH), but the 6T45 will be adaptable to both front-wheel drive (MH7) and all-wheel drive (MHC). The 6T50 is available in front-wheel or all wheel drive as well.  The transmission is based on the larger 6T70/75, and is produced at Toledo, Ohio, as well as in China. Since 2008, these transmissions have been produced by GM Daewoo at the Boryeong Transmission Plant in Boryeong, South Korea.  The facility is currently capable of producing up to 300,000 Hydra-Matic six-speed automatic transmissions annually.  The transmission is also produced in Yantai, China.

6T30 is a recent more compact and lightweight variant used on 1.8 L engine equipped variants of the North American Chevrolet Cruze and Chevrolet Sonic. The 6T40 was still used in those models equipped with the 1.4 L turbocharged engine.
GM launched the 6T35 250 nm, a higher torque variant of the 6T30, with the 2016 Cruze and its new 1.4 L turbocharged engine, saving space and approximately 24 lbs over the 6T40 used in the prior turbocharged Cruze.

Gear ratios
Gear ratios (6T40, 6T45):

Gear ratios (6T30, 6T35):

Applications 
 2008 Chevrolet Cruze/Daewoo Lacetti Premiere/Holden Cruze
 2008 Chevrolet Malibu
 2008 Daewoo Tosca/Chevrolet Epica/Chevrolet Tosca/Holden Epica
 2008 Buick LaCrosse (China)
 2009 Saturn Aura/ Pontiac G6(4-cylinder only)
 2010-2017 Chevrolet Equinox (4 cylinder only)
 2010-2017 GMC Terrain (4 cylinder only)
 2010 Opel Astra/Vauxhall Astra
 2010 Buick Regal
 2011 Chevrolet Aveo
 2012 Buick LaCrosse (USA) with eAssist
 2012 Chevrolet Sonic
 2013 Chevrolet Trax (Korea)
 2013 Buick Encore (U.S.)
 2013 Chevrolet Captiva Sport (U.S.)
 2014 Chevrolet Onix (Brazil)
 2014 Chevrolet Malibu (USA)
 2015 Chevrolet Malibu (USA)

See also
 List of GM transmissions
 GM-Ford 6-speed automatic transmission

References

 
 

6